Ulysses Moore  is a series of adventure books written by the Italian author Pierdomenico Baccalario. The plot of the series centers on the fictional village of Kilmore Cove and its Doors of Time. The book has been published by Scholastic Corporation, a New York-based publishing company.

Series
 The Door to Time  English Version 2006 
 The Long-Lost Map  English Version 2006 
 The House of Mirrors  English Version 2007   
 The Isle of Masks  English Version 2008 
 The Stone Guardians
 The First Key
 The Hidden City
 The Lord of the Ray
 The Shadow Labyrinth
 The Ice Land
 The Ash Garden
 The Imaginary Travelers
 The Boat to Time
 The Journey to the Dark Harbours
 The Pirates of the Imaginary Sea
 The Island of Rebels'
 The Battle of Time The Great Summer''

Kilmore Cove
Kilmore Cove is a hypothetical village located in Cornwall, England. This is where the main plot of the series is set. However, the adventures are not limited to this village.  Some of the main characters often travel via the "Doors of Time". The village is isolated from the rest of the world and it is not shown on maps. The Imaginary Travelers continually try to protect the "Doors of Time".

Doors of Time
The story of the first seven books focuses on the Doors of Time and their keys. There are several Doors of Time spread around the village, and each door requires its own unique key to open it. Once opened, it leads to a distant time and space specific to that door and it can only be reopened when all of the travelers who passed through it return.

The only exception is the Door of Time inside the Argo Mansion, which can take the traveler to any place he or she wants, as opposed to the fixed locations the other Doors offer. However, four keys are needed to open that one, making it the most difficult door to access. This particular door leads to a cave where there is a lake and a boat called "Metis" used to take the Travelers to their destinations.

Characters
 Jason and Julia Covenant live at the Argo Mansion, but are from London.They are twins and are eleven years old in the first book and turn thirteen in the seventh book. Julia is a little taller than Jason. Both are blond and have blue eyes. In the sixth book, Julia starts dating Rick Banner and in the eighth book Anita Bloom becomes Jason's girlfriend.
 Rick Banner is one year older than the twins and has always lived in Kilmore Cove. He is a redhead and his father died when he was young. In the sixth book, it is revealed that his father died because he was searching with Leonard Minaxo for the First Key.
 Ulysses Moore was married to Penelope Moore and they were the owners of the Argo Mansion. Nestor, the butler of the Argo Mansion, is actually Ulysses Moore, who uses this disguise because the village people bothered him. After the death of his wife, however, Ulysses stayed on as butler at the Argo Mansion
 Penelope Moore was Ulysses' wife. They met on a trip to Venice, and fell in love.
 Leonard Minaxo is the lighthouse keeper of the village and was a member of The Imaginary Travelers club, as were Ulysses and Penelope Moore. Towards the end of the sixth book it is revealed that Leonard had a secret passion for Calypso, the librarian.
 Anita Bloom enters the story in the seventh book. She lives in Venice, Italy, with her mother while her father lives in England. She finds a book from a painter who also belonged to The Imaginary Travelers club and with the help of Ulysses Moore's diaries she goes to Kilmore Cove to find the Covenant twins.
 Nestor is the caretaker of Argo Manor
Oblivia Newton is a millionaire, who wants to control all the doors and is the villain in the 1-6 books

References

Fantasy novel series
Italian books
 Italian adventure novels